Power-Packer is a producer and distributor of electro-hydraulic motion control systems for customers on a global basis, including original equipment manufacturers and first-tier suppliers in diverse end-markets. Power-Packer has headquarters in The Netherlands and the United States, and manufacturing plants in the Netherlands, the U.S., Turkey, France, Mexico, Brazil, China and India.

Power-Packer specializes in custom-made solutions for mobile applications, such as drive systems for convertible roofs and truck cabin tilting. Power-Packer is IATF certified and has been granted many supplier awards. Power-Packer is part of the CentroMotion organization, a privately held, growing portfolio of global brands that add value through innovative motion, actuation and control technologies.

Markets and solutions
Power-Packer is a manufacturer of  motion control systems for a variety of markets and applications. Power-Packer’s key product focuses include:
 Automotive: drive systems of convertible roofs, trunklid, tailgate actuation
 Truck: cabtilt, latches, levelling equipment and air-powered landing gear for semi-trailers
 Medical: adjustment systems for beds, stretchers, patient lifts, operating tables
 Recreational vehicles: roof lift systems, levelling systems, steps and trays, slide-out systems

Timeline

1970: Foundation of Power-Packer Europa B.V.

1973: Development of cab tilt systems for trucks

1981: Power-Packer invents Regenerative Hydraulic Lost Motion

1988: Start two cylinder system production

1989: Factory opened in Korea

1999: Factory acquired in Turkey

2000: Factory opened in Brazil

2000: Power-Packer becomes part of the Actuant Group

2002: Start Hycab production

2003: Start C-Hydraulic Lost Motion production

2004: Factory opened in China

2004: Acquisition of Yvel, France

2006: Introduction Quick Generator

2009: High temperature development

2010: Development of crash cab tilt cylinder

References

External links
 

Manufacturing companies of the Netherlands
Motion control
Oldenzaal